Cabestana is a genus of medium to large sea snails known as predatory whelks, marine gastropod mollusks in the family Cymatiidae.

This genus is found in warm temperate and tropical waters.

Species
The genus contains the following species:
 Cabestana africana (A. Adams, 1855)
 † Cabestana casus Kensley & Pether, 1986
 Cabestana cutacea Linnaeus, 1767
 Cabestana felipponei (von Ihering, 1907)
 Cabestana spengleri (Perry, 1811)
 Cabestana tabulata (Menke, 1843)
 † Cabestana tetleyi (Powell & Bartrum, 1929) 
Species brought into synonymy
 Cabestana costata Röding, 1798: synonym of Cabestana cutacea (Linnaeus, 1767)
 † Cabestana debelior Finlay, 1930 : synonym of Cabestana tabulata (Menke, 1843)
 Cabestana dolaria (Linnaeus, 1767): synonym of Cabestana cutacea (Linnaeus, 1767)
 Cabestana doliata Röding, 1798: synonym of Cabestana cutacea (Linnaeus, 1767)
 Cabestana otagoensis Powell, 1954 : synonym of Cabestana tabulata (Menke, 1843)
 Cabestana waterhousei (A. Adams & Angas, 1864) : synonym of Cabestana tabulata (Menke, 1843)
 Cabestana (Turritriton) labiosa (Wood, 1828): synonym of Turritriton labiosus (Wood, 1828)

References

 Powell A W B, New Zealand Mollusca, William Collins Publishers Ltd, Auckland, New Zealand 1979 
 Glen Pownall, New Zealand Shells and Shellfish, Seven Seas Publishing Pty Ltd, Wellington, New Zealand 1979 
 Gofas, S.; Le Renard, J.; Bouchet, P. (2001). Mollusca. in: Costello, M.J. et al. (eds), European Register of Marine Species: a check-list of the marine species in Europe and a bibliography of guides to their identification. Patrimoines Naturels. 50: 180-213
 Beu A.G. 2010 [August]. Neogene tonnoidean gastropods of tropical and South America: contributions to the Dominican Republic and Panama Paleontology Projects and uplift of the Central American Isthmus. Bulletins of American Paleontology 377-378: 550 pp, 79 pls. page(s): 118-119

External links
 Röding P.F. (1798). Museum Boltenianum sive Catalogus cimeliorum e tribus regnis naturæ quæ olim collegerat Joa. Fried Bolten, M. D. p. d. per XL. annos proto physicus Hamburgensis. Pars secunda continens Conchylia sive Testacea univalvia, bivalvia & multivalvia. Trapp, Hamburg. viii, 199 pp
 Schlüter, F. (1838). Kurzgefasstes systematisches Verzeichniss meiner Conchyliensammlung nebst Andeutung aller bis jetzt von mir bei Halle gefundenen Land- und Flussconchylien. Gebauersche Buchdruckerei, Halle. vii + 40 pp
 Dall W.H. (1904). An historical and systematic review of the frogshells and tritons. Smithsonian Miscellaneous Collections. 47: 114-144
 redale, T. (1936). Australian molluscan notes, no. 2. Records of the Australian Museum. 19(5): 267-340, pls 20-24

Cymatiidae
Taxa named by Peter Friedrich Röding